Cowpen Bewley is a village within the borough of Stockton-on-Tees and ceremonial county of County Durham, England.

Cowpen Bewley is situated to the east of Billingham.
Unlike typical villages, there are no shops or businesses.  The only non-residential building is a public house.

Nearby sites
Faith Wood, a woodland in County Durham

References

External links

Villages in County Durham